Du & jag döden (Swedish for You & Me Death) is the sixth studio album by Swedish alternative rock band Kent. The album was released on 15 March 2005 through RCA Records and Sony BMG. It is the final studio album to feature rhythm guitarist Harri Mänty, who left the band during the recording of Tillbaka till samtiden (2007). Du & jag döden debuted at number one in Sweden and Norway, and at number two in Denmark and Finland. As of 2007 the album had sold 220,000 copies worldwide.

Background
The band's previous album, Vapen & Ammunition (2002) became a commercial success, but lead singer and primary songwriter Joakim Berg has said it's not the album "we want to be remembered for". Kent, along with many critics, felt that Vapen & ammunition was some over-produced and according to rhythm guitarist Harri Mänty the band wanted to "rediscover, how we sound". Joakim Berg wanted to distance himself from the verse-chorus-verse based songs from the previous album, saying: "On this album I didn't want those hands in the air, sing along-choruses. Instead, I wrote longer verses, and the places where you think the chorus will come, there is instead often something else", and instead he opted for songs with "a more trance-like feeling".

The title Du & jag döden is a reference to Astrid Lindgren's children's novels Emil i Lönneberga where Emil says "Du och jag, Alfred". As the title implies, death is a major theme of the album, of which Joakim Berg has said: "Many of the songs are about the feeling of immortality, you have within you at the age of 18. Which really is ironic because you are vulnerable especially during that time because life has not hardened you yet. Later you must come to terms with the actions of your past – the years of atonement, I will call them. And then it goes downhill with aging. So when it comes to death, then it is not the exhalation we fear. But the time leading up to it". The theme is most prominent in the song "Mannen i den vita hatten (16 år senare)" where Berg sings "Vi ska alla en gång dö" ("We will all die one day"). Berg has said of the song: "Death and taxes are the only thing you cannot avoid. It sounds depressing when you only hear that line, but the gist is that you should not worry, but do something with the time you have. Everyone is striving toward a goal all the time that seem to be based on some kind of dissatisfaction, no matter how well you are feeling." In keeping with the theme, the plastic album cover and the playable side of the CD are both black.

Commercial performance
In Sweden, the album debuted at number one, becoming their fifth number-one album. The album debuted at number two in Denmark, selling 4200 copies in its first week.

Track listing

The song title "Järnspöken" plays on an expression in Swedish, "Hjärnspöken", which literally means "brain ghosts" and refers to imagined problems, from fixations and unfounded fears to paranoia and hallucinations. "Hjärna" is Swedish for "brain", whereas "järn" means "iron", but the two words are pronounced the same way.
 The song title “Den döda vinkeln” literally means “The Dead Angle”, but a more accurate translation would be “The Blind Spot”, as the expression refers to a driver’s blind spot in a car. 
A limited edition of the album was also available. This included postcards sensitive to UV-light, a booklet printed on especially thin paper and a poster with the cover picture, among other things. The limitation was 9,000 items.
The album was also available on vinyl, limited to 1,500 pressings.

Personnel
Kent – producer
Stefan Boman – producer, mixing, recording
Simon Nordberg – mixing
Joakim Berg – lyrics, music
Martin Sköld – music on track 5, 7, 9
Chris Blair – mastering
Martin Brengesjö – instrument technician

Charts

Weekly charts

Year-end charts

References

External links

2005 albums
Kent (band) albums